Michael Rich may refer to:

 Michael Rich (cyclist) (born 1969), German road bicycle racer
 Michael D. Rich, President and CEO of the RAND Corporation
 R. Michael Rich (born 1957), American astrophysicist 
 Mike Rich, American screenwriter